Marianne Faithfull is the debut studio album by English singer Marianne Faithfull. It was released simultaneously with her album Come My Way on 15 April 1965 by Decca Records. The double release was a result of different creative directions. While the record label pressed Faithfull to record a pop album, she wanted to record an album of folk songs. Even after the label suggested an album containing both genres, Faithfull decided to make two separate albums instead; Marianne Faithfull as the pop album and Come My Way as the folk album. In the United States, it was released by London Records with a slightly different track list and inclusion of the song "This Little Bird".

The front cover photography is by David Bailey and the back by Gered Mankowitz. The arrangements were by David Whittaker and Jon Mark with Mike Leander directing the arrangements. The engineer at Decca Studios was Peter Hitchcock and Gus Dudgeon at Lansdowne Studios, Holland Park.

Track listing

Personnel 
 Marianne Faithfull – vocals
 Tony Calder – producer
 Mike Leander – arrangements, direction
 David Whitaker – arrangements
 Jon Mark – arrangements
 Peter Hitchcock – engineer
 Gus Dudgeon – engineer
 David Bailey – photography
 Gered Mankowitz – photography

Credits adapted from the album liner notes.

Charts

Notes

References

External links 
 [ Marianne Faithfull] at AllMusic
 

1965 debut albums
Marianne Faithfull albums
Albums arranged by Mike Leander
Albums produced by Tony Calder
Decca Records albums